Andrei Rekechinski (born 7 January 1981) is a retired Russian water polo player who played on the silver medal squad at the 2000 Summer Olympics and the bronze medal squad at the 2004 Summer Olympics. Since 2016-2022, he worked as a general director for the football club FC Rotor Volgograd.

See also
 List of Olympic medalists in water polo (men)
 List of World Aquatics Championships medalists in water polo

References

External links
 

1981 births
Living people
Russian male water polo players
Water polo players at the 2000 Summer Olympics
Water polo players at the 2004 Summer Olympics
Olympic water polo players of Russia
Olympic silver medalists for Russia
Olympic bronze medalists for Russia
Sportspeople from Volgograd
Olympic medalists in water polo
Medalists at the 2004 Summer Olympics
Kazakhstani male water polo players
Asian Games medalists in water polo
Water polo players at the 2014 Asian Games
Medalists at the 2000 Summer Olympics
World Aquatics Championships medalists in water polo
Asian Games gold medalists for Kazakhstan
Medalists at the 2014 Asian Games